Khuda Kasam is a 1981 Indian Hindi-language film directed by Lekh Tandon and produced by Baldev Pushkarna. It stars Vinod Khanna, Tina Munim in lead roles, along with Pran, Ajit, Nazneen, Kamini Kaushal in pivotal roles. Dharmendra was in a special appearance here. The music was composed by Laxmikant-Pyarelal.

Cast
 Vinod Khanna as Sumer Singh
 Tina Munim as Tina
 Pran as Ranveer Singh / Girdharilal
 Ajit as Raizada Hukamchand
 Madan Puri as Kishanlal
 Shakti Kapoor as Khanna
 Nazneen as Geeta Singh
 Kamini Kaushal as Nirmala Singh
 Dharmendra as Maharaja Bhunam
 Jalal Agha as Pancham
 C.S. Dubey as Pandit
 Chandrashekhar as Inspector
 Surendra Pal as Chouhan, World Airways Representative
 Zahira as Lathika
 Pinchoo Kapoor as Hotel Customer

Songs
Lyrics: Majrooh Sultanpuri

External links

1980s Hindi-language films
1981 films
Films scored by Laxmikant–Pyarelal